Bairin Right Banner (Mongolian:    Baɣarin Baraɣun qosiɣu) is a banner of eastern Inner Mongolia, China. It is under the administration of Chifeng City,  to the south-southeast. Baarin Mongols live here. The distinct Mongolian dialect of this region is Baarin Mongolian.

Climate

References

External links
www.xzqh.org 

Banners of Inner Mongolia
Chifeng